The County of Warner No. 5 is a municipal district in southern Alberta, Canada. Located in Census Division No. 2 just north of the United States border, its municipal office is located in the Village of Warner.

History 

1912 - Warner was originally organised as a rural municipality. 
January, 1913 - Municipal District of Warner No. 36 incorporated.
January 23, 1923 - Municipal District of Sugar City No. 37 incorporated.
1942 - Sugar City Municipality enlarged to include Local Improvement District No. 7 and portions of Local Improvement Districts 8, 38 and 67.
January 6, 1950 - Warner Municipality enlarged to include Milk River, Coutts and Masinasin districts.
December 31, 1953 - Sugar City dissolved and portion added to the Municipal District of Warner.
January 1, 1954 - County of Warner No. 5 incorporated.

Geography 
The County of Warner No. 5 comprises approximately 50 townships and is bordered on the south by the Canada-United States border. It is composed of the former Municipal District of Warner No. 36 and a portion of the former Municipal District of Sugar City No. 37.

Communities and localities 
The following urban municipalities are surrounded by the County of Warner No. 5.
Cities
none
Towns
Milk River
Raymond
Villages
Coutts
Stirling
Warner
Summer villages
none

The following hamlets are located within the County of Warner No. 5.
Hamlets
New Dayton
Wrentham

The following localities are located within the County of Warner No. 5.
Localities 
Clarinda
Conrad
Craddock
Elmspring
Judson
Knappen
Lucky Strike
Masinasin
Maybutt
McNab
Miami
New Rockport
St. Kilda
Other places
Allerston (Doran)
Mammoth
One-Seventeen
Two-Fifteen

Demographics 

In the 2016 Census of Population conducted by Statistics Canada, the County of Warner No. 5 had a population of 3,847 living in 816 of its 941 total private dwellings, a  change from its 2011 population of 3,841.

Attractions 

Stirling Agricultural Village, National Historic Site of Canada
Warner elevator row, last surviving "Grain Elevator Row" in Alberta.
Galt Historic Railway Park
Michelsen Farmstead
William T. Ogden House
Lost Frontier Mini-Railway
Writing-on-Stone Provincial Park
Devil's Coulee Dinosaur Heritage Museum
Centennial Park
Stirling Elevator
Neils Hogenson House
Andrew Larson House
Temple Hill
Raymond Golf Club
Milk River Golf Club

Events 
Stirling Settler Days
Victorian Prairie Christmas - Galt Railway Park
Raymond Stampede
Milk River Bonanza Days
Coutts Days
Warner Dino Days

Education 
Westwind School Division No. 74 and Horizon School Division No. 67 provide education within the boundaries of the County of Warner No. 5.

Early school districts
Listed below are the former school districts that once provided education within the County of Warner No. 5.

See also 
List of communities in Alberta
List of municipal districts in Alberta

References

External links 

 
Warner